Rowena Bali (born 1977) is a Mexican writer.

Bali studied dance, drama and pantomime in the Instituto Nacional de Bellas Artes y Literatura in Mexico City.
She studied Spanish language and literature at the National Autonomous University of Mexico and Universidad de Guanajuato.

Selected works
 El agente Morboso
 La herida en el cielo
 El Ejército de Sodoma
 La bala enamorada, 
 Hablando de Gerzon, 
 Amazon party, 
 Tina o el misterio.

Storybook
 De vanidades y divinidades

Poetry 
 Voto de indecisión

External links
http://impreso.milenio.com/node/8063565

References

Mexican women poets
1977 births
Living people
National Autonomous University of Mexico alumni